Tom Maentz (born c. 1934) is a former American football player who played end for the University of Michigan Wolverines from 1954-1956.  Maentz played on offense and defense and also served as the punter for the Michigan football team.  Maentz and Ron Kramer became known as Michigan's "touchdown twins." They were the first University of Michigan athletes to appear on the cover of Sports Illustrated.  Maentz was a second-team All-American in 1955 and captain of the 1956 football team.  In 1994, he was inducted into the University of Michigan Athletic Hall of Honor.

Early years
A native of Holland, Michigan, Maentz enrolled at Michigan at the same time as Michigan's legendary Hall of Fame end, Ron Kramer.  Maentz and Kramer played together as ends on Michigan's freshman team in 1953 and were the starting ends for Michigan from 1954-1956. Though he played in Kramer's shadow, Maentz was also recognized as one of the best ends in the county.  Kramer later recalled playing with Maentz on the freshman team, helping the varsity team prepare for the Ohio State game.  Kramer noted, "Surprisingly, we started throwing the ball to Tom Maentz and me, and the backs couldn't cover us."

1955 season
Maentz and Kramer, who became known as Michigan's "touchdown twins," were the first Michigan football players to appear on the cover of Sports Illustrated.  In October 1955, Maentz was selected by the Associated Press as for the Lineman of the Week award after scoring two touchdowns in a 33-21 win over Iowa.  Michigan Coach Bennie Oosterbaan said of the pair, "They are the two greatest ends in the country."  After the Iowa game, Michigan halfback Tony Branoff said, "Tom played one of the greatest games.  He's as good as Kramer, and after he caught that touchdown pass Iowa's heads were down."  In awarding Maentz Lineman of the Week honors, the Associated Press referred to him as "that other end." It noted :"Little was heard of Maentz when the season started.  He was overshadowed by big Ron Kramer, Michigan's other versatile end who himself snagged two passes for 79 yards and a touchdown ...  It was Maentz who grabbed five passes for 169 yards and two touchdowns, including the one that gave Michigan its first lead over the Hawkeyes in the last three minutes of the game."

Despite a back injury that required him to wear a protective plaster shell screwed to his hip pad, Maentz led Michigan in pass receiving yards in 1955 and was selected as an All-Big Ten end.  Maentz also excelled as a kicker, punting 15 times in 1955 for 602 yards and an average of 40.1 yards. Maentz was also named a second-team All-American by the United Press for 1955.  Detroit News sports writer Watson Spoelstra published a column in 1955 about Maentz in which he wrote:"Tom Maentz isn't quite as big as Ron Kramer.  He can't run as fast, but Maentz stepped up his speed this season ... Oosterbaan marveled aloud about Maentz's spectacular catch just before the half at Minnesota.  The play cleared the way to victory.  Oosterbaan spoke with admiration of Maentz's catch of a 33-yard pass by Tony Branoff in the end zone against Iowa.  'He had to run like mad to get that ball,' Bennie said.  'Tom never gives up.' ... 'Tom never will be as big as Kramer,' Bennie said.  'But he is well knit.'"

1956 season
After Maentz was selected as the captain of the 1956 team, residents of his hometown held a "Tom Maentz Night" at the Holland Civic Center attended by 600 area residents.  At the time, Maentz called it "the greatest honor I've ever received and I'll never forget it."  Michigan ends coach, Matt Patanelli described Maentz as an "ideal athlete," who was a champion in the classroom and on the football field.  Patanelli noted that Maentz had demonstrated his toughness, continuing to play football after suffering a broken jaw as a freshman, a neck injury as a sophomore, and a back injury as a junior.

After the 1956 season, Maentz played in the East-West All-Star Shrine Game and was named as a third-team All-American by the United Press, Central Press Association, and Newspaper Enterprise Association.

Later years
Kramer and Maentz both graduated in 1957, and professional football teams drafted both. Kramer was drafted by the Green Bay Packers as the fourth pick in the draft, and Maentz was drafted by the Chicago Cardinals as the 22nd pick in the draft.  From their freshman year in 1954, Kramer and Maentz remained close friends.  In 2001, Sports Illustrated published a profile of the two men, 35 years after their appearance on the magazine's cover.  The article noted:"Kramer, a two-time All-America, and Maentz, team captain in 1956, were two of the finest pass-catching ends in the country. They also played defense and even punted the ball. It seems they've done everything together since coming to Ann Arbor from different sides of the state. Maentz was the quiet kid from western Michigan, the son of a banker; Kramer was the unpolished Detroiter. But, says Kramer, they found a 'common denominator' in football and lived in the same dorms and at the Sigma Chi fraternity house for four years.  Both were married in 1957 and fathered boys born a day apart the following July."

Kramer was one of the initial inductees into the University of Michigan Athletic Hall of Honor in 1978. Maentz joined him as an inductee in 1994.  In 2003, Maentz donated funds to build a new locker room for the Wolverines at Michigan stadium.

See also
 University of Michigan Athletic Hall of Honor
 1956 College Football All-America Team

Notes

Michigan Wolverines football players
People from Holland, Michigan
Living people
Year of birth missing (living people)